The 2010 United States Senate election in North Dakota took place on November 2, 2010, alongside other elections to the United States Senate in other states as well as elections to the United States House of Representatives and various state and local elections. Incumbent Democratic-NPL U.S. senator Byron Dorgan announced in January 2010 that he would not seek reelection, leading to the first open seat election since 1992. Republican governor John Hoeven won the seat in a landslide, taking 76.1% of the vote, sweeping every county in the state, and becoming North Dakota's first Republican senator since 1987. Hoeven's 54 point margin of victory was a dramatic and historic shift from the previous election for this seat, when Dorgan won reelection in a 36 point landslide and himself swept every county in the state.

Background 
Incumbent Byron Dorgan never had a difficult time getting elected, as he obtained 59%, 63%, and 68% in his three senate election bids, respectively. However, in December 2009, Rasmussen Reports conducted a hypothetical matchup of Governor John Hoeven against the incumbent. Hoeven led by a large margin, 58% to Dorgan's 36%. Polls showed that 61% of the state still had a favorable view of Dorgan, and if pitted against state senator Duane Sand, the incumbent led 52% to 37%.

Several prominent members of the North Dakota Democratic-NPL Party expressed an interest in the U.S. Senate race once Senator Dorgan announced that he would not run again. Among those people were Joel Heitkamp, a former North Dakota state senator and current radio talk show host of News and Views on KFGO in Fargo. His sister, former North Dakota attorney general Heidi Heitkamp of Bismarck, also considered running, but declined to enter the race as well.

Others who had indicated an interest in the race were businesswoman Kristin Hedger and national progressive talk show host Ed Schultz. Hedger was the Democratic candidate for North Dakota secretary of state in the 2006 general election, which she lost to the incumbent, Republican Alvin Jaeger.

While flattered to have been asked, Schultz said he had to decline in that he would have been forced to give up his nightly television program on MSNBC The Ed Show as well as his daily progressive national radio show, The Ed Schultz Show, in order to run.

Also, Federal Communications Commission regulations decree that equal and free air time would have had to be given to whoever Schultz's opponents would have been in the election in order to allow them to respond to anything that Schultz would have said about them on his programs.

Democratic-NPL primary

Candidates 
 Tracy Potter, state senator

Results

Republican primary

Candidates 
 John Hoeven, Governor of North Dakota

Results

Libertarian primary

Candidates 
 Keith Hanson

Results

General election

Candidates 
 Keith Hanson (L), engineer
 John Hoeven (R), governor
 Tracy Potter (D), state senator

Campaign 
Hoeven was challenged in the race by North Dakota state senator Tracy Potter of Bismarck. Potter received the endorsement of the North Dakota Democratic-NPL Party at its state convention on March 27, 2010. Governor Hoeven and Senator Potter advanced to the November 2, 2010 general election following balloting in North Dakota's primary election, which was held on June 8, 2010.  Neither candidate faced any significant opposition in the primary election.

Aggregate polling indicated that Hoeven had large leads against Potter. Hoeven was enormously popular and enjoyed instant name recognition throughout the state of North Dakota. Hoeven was elected to an unprecedented third consecutive four-year term as governor in November 2008. Hoeven's election in 2010 to the U.S. Senate appeared to be all but a sure thing even before the campaign officially started. The immensely popular Hoeven enjoyed double-digit leads in opinion polling relative to the U.S. Senate race since earlier this year.

John Hoeven was sworn into the U.S. Senate on January 3, 2011.

Predictions

Polling

Fundraising

Results 

The results were a complete reversal from 2004, with every single county flipping from Democrat to Republican, including Sioux County, home of the Standing Rock Indian Reservation.

References

External links 
 North Dakota - Elections and Voting
 U.S. Congress candidates for North Dakota at Project Vote Smart
 North Dakota U.S. Senate 2010 from OurCampaigns.com
 Campaign contributions from Open Secrets
 2010 North Dakota Senate General Election: All Head-to-Head Matchups graph of multiple polls from Pollster.com
 Election 2010: North Dakota Senate from Rasmussen Reports
 2010 North Dakota Senate Race from Real Clear Politics
 2010 North Dakota Senate Race from CQ Politics
 Race profile from The New York Times
Official campaign websites (Archived)
 Keith Hanson for U.S. Senate
 John Hoeven for U.S. Senate
 Tracy Potter for U.S. Senate
 Paul Sorum for U.S. Senate

2010 North Dakota elections
North Dakota
2010